St. François Xavier Airport  is located in the Rural Municipality of St. François Xavier, Manitoba, Canada.

References

Registered aerodromes in Manitoba